Glenns Ferry High School is a four-year public secondary school in Elmore County, Idaho, located in the city of Glenns Ferry.

With 140 students in four grades, GFHS has the second highest enrollment in the county, behind Mountain Home High School. The school colors are orange and black and its mascot is a pilot.

Athletics
Glenns Ferry competes in athletics in IHSAA Class 1A in the Snake River Conference,

State titles
Boys
 Football (2): fall (A-3, now 2A) 1994, 1995 (official with introduction of A-3 playoffs in fall 1977)1981 Boys Basketball

Notable alumni
 Korey Hall – NFL fullback – Green Bay Packers/New Orleans Saints

References

External links
 Glenns Ferry H.S.
 MaxPreps.com – Glenns Ferry Pilots football
 MaxPreps.com – Glenns Ferry Pilots boys basketball
 Glenns Ferry School District #192

Public high schools in Idaho
Schools in Elmore County, Idaho